Devon (also known by many other names) is a type of manufactured meat product sold in Australia and New Zealand.

Overview
Typical commercial preparations list the major ingredient as "meat including pork". It is usually composed of several types of pork, basic spices, and a binder.

It is considered to be a cheap meat product and is sold in the deli section of supermarkets. 

It is usually served in a sandwich, often with tomato sauce, and can also be fried in slices.

Devon would be classed as "luncheon meat" in the UK or a "cold cut" in the USA.

Devon is sometimes associated with "blackfulla feed" (that is, the food commonly eaten by modern Indigenous Australians, not to be confused with bush tucker which is traditional foods originating before colonisation) because many Aboriginal and Torres Strait Islanders are of lower socioeconomic status, and devon is inexpensive. One Sydney Indigenous father gained notoriety on social media for his cooking, often including devon. However, this laughing self-identification with "unhealthy" processed food high in fat, has also been criticised from within the Aboriginal community.

Terminology
The product is known by a variety of names in different regions of Australia and New Zealand:

 "luncheon" or “Belgium” - New Zealand
 "polony" - Western Australia
 “Belgium" or "devon" in Victoria, Tasmania, Queensland, New South Wales and the Australian Capital Territory
 "fritz" - South Australia
 "Windsor sausage" - Queensland

Originally known in some parts of Australia as "German sausage", this name fell out of favour during World War I when Australia was at war with Germany. 'Veal German' is another facsimile. It is similar in appearance and taste to the bologna sausage and the cooked pork sausage known in Australia as Berliner.

Though similar in usage and appearance, South Australians maintain that devon is not in fact related to the South Australian "Bung Fritz", which is manufactured using a process and recipe entirely unique to South Australia, particularly in the use of the sheep's appendix (known as the bung, where Bung Fritz gets the name).

It may be referred to as Strass, from the word Strassburg, though this term is usually associated with another style of processed meat roll characterised by a waxy red 'skin' and fat-mottled, chunkier texture.

See also
 South Australian food and drink

References

External links
 Macquarie Dictionary/ABC Online entry for "belgium sausage"
 Macquarie Dictionary entry for "devon"
 Macquarie Dictionary entry for "polony"

Australian sausages
New Zealand sausages
Lunch meat